The 1994 NBA playoffs was the postseason tournament of the National Basketball Association's 1993-94 season. The tournament concluded with the Western Conference champion Houston Rockets defeating the Eastern Conference champion New York Knicks 4 games to 3 in the NBA Finals. Hakeem Olajuwon was named NBA Finals MVP.

This was also the first time that the Boston Celtics (since 1979) and Los Angeles Lakers (since 1976) missed the playoffs. It was their first absence from the playoffs since the playoff field expanded to 16 teams in 1984. It was also the first time that both missed the playoffs in the same year. This would not occur again until 2014. It also marked the first time both of the two Los Angeles-based NBA teams, the Lakers and Clippers (who arrived in L.A. in 1984), missed the playoffs together.

The biggest upset came in the first round, when the Denver Nuggets came back from a 2–0 deficit to beat the Seattle SuperSonics in five games, marking the first time in NBA history that an eighth seed had defeated a #1 seed. Denver stretched their improbable playoff run with the Utah Jazz to seven games after being down 0–3, but Utah defeated them in Game 7 91–81.

The playoffs also featured the first playoff series victory for the Indiana Pacers in their 18-year NBA existence, as they swept the Orlando Magic (who were making their first playoff appearance in franchise history) in the first round, then eliminated the top-seeded Atlanta Hawks 4–2 in the second round. The Pacers advanced within one game of the NBA Finals, but lost Games 6 and 7 of the Eastern Conference Finals to the Knicks.

This was the first time since the ABA–NBA merger prior to the 1976–77 season that all former ABA teams (Pacers, Nuggets, Spurs, and Nets) made the playoffs in the same year.

The Chicago Bulls, who made the playoffs despite the retirement of Michael Jordan, swept the Cleveland Cavaliers in the first round, but then lost in seven games to the Knicks in the Eastern Conference Semifinals.

The Knicks made history by playing a record 25 playoff games (one short of the maximum), the most postseason games an NBA team has played. The 2005 Detroit Pistons tied this record. However, it was broken by the 2008 Celtics. Their easiest series was the first-round 3–1 win over the Nets. New York then forced three consecutive Game 7s, eliminating the Bulls 4–3 in the Conference Semifinals, knocking off the Pacers 4–3 in the Conference Finals, both times at Madison Square Garden, before losing in Game 7 to the Rockets at The Summit in the NBA Finals, which meant New York was denied NBA and NHL titles. Game 4 of the Finals took place at the Garden a day after the New York Rangers won their first Stanley Cup in 54 years in Game 7 of the 1994 Stanley Cup Finals.

In the Western Conference, the Golden State Warriors made their last playoff appearance until 2007. Game 3 of the Suns–Warriors series would be the last playoff game to take place inside the original bowl of the Oakland Coliseum Arena; the building was heavily renovated with increased seating capacity throughout the 1996–97 season, during which the Warriors moved to San Jose Arena, home of the NHL's San Jose Sharks. The arena was reopened the following season.

Game 3 of the Bulls-Cavaliers series was the last game played at the Richfield Coliseum.

Game 6 of the Bulls-Knicks series was the last game played at Chicago Stadium.

Game 5 of the Nuggets-Sonics series was the last to be played at Seattle Center Coliseum before its first renovation and eventual rechristening as KeyArena in 1995. During the renovations, the Sonics played the intervening 1994–95 NBA season at Tacoma Dome in nearby Tacoma, Washington; the arena had also been used intermittently by them during the early 1990s. After the SuperSonics relocated to and rebranded as the Oklahoma City Thunder in 2008, the building (which is still being used by the Sonics' former WNBA sister team Seattle Storm) later received a second renovation project to accommodate the NHL's Seattle Kraken. This third iteration of the Coliseum became Climate Pledge Arena and was reopened in 2021.

This would be last time when neither conference's number one seed reached the Conference Finals until 2021.

Clock Incident
The Clock Incident happened in the last moments of Game 4 of the Western Conference Finals between the Rockets and Jazz. Tom Chambers inbounded the ball to Jeff Hornacek with 13.5 seconds left and Utah down 2. As play resumed, the Jazz timekeeper did not start the clock as they were trying to look for an open shot. After 8 seconds, the clock finally started as Chambers got the ball down low but Utah did not take advantage of the extra time they were given, and after Chambers attempted a shot and missed, there was a mad scramble for the ball. It ended up in Robert Horry's hands, who passed it to Kenny Smith; Houston ran out the clock to win 80–78.

Bracket

First round

Eastern Conference first round

(1) Atlanta Hawks vs. (8) Miami Heat

This was the first playoff meeting between the Hawks and the Heat.

(2) New York Knicks vs. (7) New Jersey Nets

This was the second playoff meeting between these two teams, with the Knicks winning the first meeting.

(3) Chicago Bulls vs. (6) Cleveland Cavaliers

 Final Cavaliers game at Richfield Coliseum.

This was the fifth playoff meeting between these two teams, with the Bulls winning the first four meetings.

(4) Orlando Magic vs. (5) Indiana Pacers

 Byron Scott hits the game-winning 3 with 2 seconds left.

This was the first playoff meeting between the Pacers and the Magic.

Western Conference first round

(1) Seattle SuperSonics vs. (8) Denver Nuggets

 Denver becomes the first 8th seed to beat the 1st seed in playoff history.

This was the third playoff meeting between these two teams, with each team winning one series apiece.

(2) Houston Rockets vs. (7) Portland Trail Blazers

 Hakeem's big block on Rod Strickland's layup.

This was the second playoff meeting between these two teams, with the Rockets winning the first meeting.

(3) Phoenix Suns vs. (6) Golden State Warriors

This was the third playoff meeting between these two teams, with the Suns winning the first two meetings.

(4) San Antonio Spurs vs. (5) Utah Jazz

This was the first playoff meeting between the Spurs and the Jazz.

Conference semifinals

Eastern Conference semifinals

(1) Atlanta Hawks vs. (5) Indiana Pacers

This was the second playoff meeting between these two teams, with the Hawks winning the first meeting.

(2) New York Knicks vs. (3) Chicago Bulls

 Toni Kukoč hits the game-winner at the buzzer.

 Hue Hollins' controversial foul call.

 Scottie Pippen's famous dunk on Patrick Ewing; final Bulls game at Chicago Stadium.

This was the sixth playoff meeting between these two teams, with the Bulls winning the first five meetings.

Western Conference semifinals

(2) Houston Rockets vs. (3) Phoenix Suns

 Kevin Johnson's famous dunk on Hakeem Olajuwon.

 The Rockets become the second team to win a best-of-seven playoff series after losing the first 2 games at home.

This was the first playoff meeting between the Rockets and the Suns.

(5) Utah Jazz vs. (8) Denver Nuggets

 
 Karl Malone hits the game-tying shot with 9.2 seconds left.

 Reggie Williams hits the game-winner with 1.9 seconds left.

 Denver became the first team since the 1951 New York Knicks to force a Game 7 after being down 0–3.

This was the third playoff meeting between these two teams, with each team winning one series apiece.

Conference finals

Eastern Conference finals

(2) New York Knicks vs. (5) Indiana Pacers

 Reggie Miller's 25-point 4th quarter performance.

 Patrick Ewing's clutch dunk with 26.9 seconds left.

This was the second playoff meeting between these two teams, with the Knicks winning the first meeting.

Western Conference finals

(2) Houston Rockets vs. (5) Utah Jazz

This was the second playoff meeting between these two teams, with the Jazz winning the first meeting.

NBA Finals (W2) Houston Rockets vs. (E2) New York Knicks

 Sam Cassell hits the game-winning 3 with 32.6 seconds left.

 Hakeem Olajuwon blocks John Starks' title-winning 3-point attempt.

This was the second playoff meeting between these two teams, with the Rockets winning the first meeting.

References

External links
Basketball-Reference.com's 1994 NBA Playoffs page

National Basketball Association playoffs
Playoffs
Sports in Portland, Oregon
GMA Network television specials

fi:NBA-kausi 1993–1994#Pudotuspelit